"Lovesick" is the second single performed by Emily Osment from her debut studio album, Fight or Flight (2010). It was released on October 9, 2010. The music video premiered on January 14, 2011, exclusively on Myspace. The EP version of the single has a different cover, using the same background photoshoot of Osment from the "Let's Be Friends" single cover. It also uses the same font as the album cover, but instead of reading "Fight or Flight", it reads "Lovesick". In the US, the single cover shows a picture of Osment from the Fight or Flight booklet.

In the United Kingdom the song was used as the official track, to promote popular multichannel ITV2 in the spring of 2011 and thus, has received strong download sales due to its popularity. The UK artwork uses the image seen on first single "Let's Be Friends". The single was released as Osment's debut release in the UK and managed to reach #2 on the official singles chart in South Korea.

Music video

The music video is directed by Daniel "Cloud" Campos, premiered exclusively on MySpace and YouTube. The video featured a whole new look to Osment with a metallic dress and a new hairstyle. The entire video took place in the dark with various types of lighting revealing Osment and the band performing. These various lights include colored lighting and flashlights attached to the hands of Osment's band members. The video was shot on location somewhere in Los Angeles, CA. On December 15, 2010, Osment uploaded a fan music video to the song onto her YouTube channel. The video features pictures of her fans with the word "Lovesick.". On December 17, 2010, a behind-the-scenes look at the music video was released, which also discusses the theme, design, costumes, etc.

Chart performance 
"Lovesick" debuted on the UK Singles Chart at number 156. On April 17, 2011, the single entered the UK top 100 at number 67. On April 24, the song jumped 10 places to number 57.

Track listing

Single version

EP version

Personnel
Credits for "Lovesick" adapted from AllMusic.
 Doug Fenske - mixing
 Toby Gad - engineering, vocal producer
 Nellee Hooper - producer
 Scott Hull - mastering
 Emily Osment - primary artist
 Lindy Robbins - composer

Charts

Release history

References

2010 songs
2011 singles
Emily Osment songs
Songs written by Toby Gad
Songs written by Lindy Robbins
Song recordings produced by Nellee Hooper